The Sint-Lodewijkscollege  is a Catholic high school (subsidized free school) in the centre of Lokeren, Belgium.

History
The historic baroque building was built in 1714 for the family Van Kersschaever. The facade is a classified heritage site and protected monument. The actual school was established in 1850 by the bishop of Ghent, Louis-Joseph Delebecque.

In earlier times, there was also elementary education and a Boarding school, which closed in 1971. In 1969, it was one of the first schools which abolished single-sex education in Flanders.
Since the 1990s, the number of students remained stable around 1000.

Education
Students follow three cycles  during 6 years of education. The school offers only ASO-education, which is a normal type of education that prepares the students for higher education and university. Subjects include Math, Science, Human science, Classical languages, Modern languages and Economics.
The school educates its students from a Catholic point of view.

School principals (Dutch directeur):
Principal: Caroline De Ridder

Trivia
Graduating students give a yearly benefit-performance, Avond van de Zesdes.

Notable students
 Anne Van Lancker
 Lieven Scheire
 Jonas Geirnaert
 Linde Merckpoel
 Chris Van den Durpel
 Bram Willems
 Stijn Vlaminck

External links
 Official website

References

Lokeren
Catholic schools in Belgium
Educational institutions established in 1850
Houses completed in 1714
1850 establishments in Belgium